Nancy Valentine (born Annette Valentine; January 21, 1928 – July 31, 2017) was an American actress, known for her roles in The Black Castle (1952), Deadline Midnight (1959) and Small Town Girl (1953).

Biography
Valentine was born in St. Albans, Queens, New York City. She started her career as a Conover Model before becoming an actress. She later left Hollywood to become the first wife of Jagaddipendra Narayan Bhup Bahadur, K.C.I.E (15 December 1915 – 11 April 1970) Maharaja of Cooch-Behar, in India.

While dining at the famed El Morocco nightclub one night in 1946, Nancy was discovered by Howard Hughes, who signed her to a long-term contract with 20th Century Fox.

Death
Valentine died at her home in Malibu, California on July 31, 2017.

Filmography 
She had parts in many TV shows in the 50s and 60s, including Racket Squad, Lawman (1960), Dragnet, The Real McCoys, 77 Sunset Strip and Sea Hunt. She played Fliss, the Matron of Honor, in Father of the Bride, and was in TV movies such as The Girl Most Likely to... and Night Slaves.

References

External links
 
 Maharani Nancy Valentine on Facebook

Actresses from New York City
American actresses
1928 births
2017 deaths
21st-century American women